Chavor (also Romanized as Chāvor; also known as Chāveh, Chīr, Chūvīr, Chuwir, and Jāvor) is a village in Zanjanrud-e Pain Rural District, Zanjanrud District, Zanjan County, Zanjan Province, Iran. At the 2006 census, its population was 16, in 5 families.

References 

Populated places in Zanjan County